Orphilinae is a subfamily of beetles that includes three genera: Orphilodes, Orphilus and Ranolus. It was described by John Lawrence LeConte in 1861.

References

External links
Orphilinae at ITIS

Dermestidae